KHS can stand for:

Businesses
 KHS GmbH, a German manufacturer of packaging and bottling machinery
 KHS Bicycles, an American and Taiwan-based bicycle manufacturer
 KHS Musical Instruments, a Taiwan-based musical instrument manufacturer

Schools
 Kagman High School, a public (government) school in Saipan, Saipan, CNMI, US
 Kaiserslautern High School, a Department of Defense operated international school in Kaiserslautern, Germany
 Keira High School, in North Wollongong, New South Wales, Australia
 Kents Hill School, an independent college-preparatory school in Kents Hill, Maine, USA
 Kingsley High School (Michigan), a public high school in Kingsley, Michigan
 Kingston High School (New York), a comprehensive four-year school in Kingston, New York
 Kingswood House School, a prep school in Epsom, England
 Kirkwood High School, a public secondary school in Kirkwood, Missouri
 Kong Hwa School, a primary school in Singapore
 Kurtköy High School, a secondary public anatolian school in Pendik, Turkey

Societies
 Kasturba Health Society, in Sevagram, Wardha, Maharashtra, India
 Kentucky Historical Society

Other uses
 Knight of the Order of the Holy Sepulchre, a chivalric order (KHS)
 Khasab Airport, in Khasab, Oman, which goes by the IATA code of KHS
 Karate High School, a pop-punk/post-hardcore band from San Francisco, California, USA
 Kurt Hugo Schneider, American musician and producer, also credited as KHS
 Potassium hydrosulfide, chemical formula KHS